Yulia Sergeyevina Kozik (born 17 February 1997) is a Russian basketball player for  Dynamo Kursk and the Russian national team. 

She participated at the 2015 FIBA European U20 championships, 2016 FIBA European U20 championships, 2017 FIBA European U20 championships, winning a bronze medal.

She qualified for the 2020 Summer Olympics, playing in a team with Mariia Cherepanova, Olga Frolkina, and Anastasia Logunova in the 3×3 tournament.

References 

1997 births
Living people
3x3 basketball players at the 2020 Summer Olympics
Basketball players at the 2019 European Games
European Games competitors for Russia
Medalists at the 2020 Summer Olympics
Olympic 3x3 basketball players of Russia
Olympic medalists in 3x3 basketball
Russian women's 3x3 basketball players
Russian women's basketball players
Small forwards
Olympic silver medalists for the Russian Olympic Committee athletes
21st-century Russian women